Yves Brouzet (5 September 1948 – 9 May 2003) was a French shot putter.

Biography
Brouzet was born in Béziers, and represented the clubs Stade Français and Grenoble UC. He finished fourth at the 1970 European Indoor Championships, fourteenth at the 1971 European Indoor Championships, eighth at the 1971 European Championships, won the bronze medal at the 1971 Mediterranean Games, finished fifth at the 1972 European Indoor Championships, and twelfth at the 1972 Olympic Games.

He then finished sixth at the 1976 European Indoor Championships eleventh at the 1981 European Indoor Championships, and eighth at the 1982 European Indoor Championships. He competed at the 1976 Olympic Games without reaching the final. He became French champion in 1972, 1973, 1975 and 1976, and French indoor champion in 1972, 1973, 1974, 1976, 1980 and 1982. His personal best put was 20.20 metres, achieved in July 1973 in Colombes.

References

1948 births
2003 deaths
Sportspeople from Béziers
French male shot putters
Athletes (track and field) at the 1972 Summer Olympics
Athletes (track and field) at the 1976 Summer Olympics
Olympic athletes of France
Mediterranean Games bronze medalists for France
Mediterranean Games medalists in athletics
Athletes (track and field) at the 1971 Mediterranean Games
20th-century French people
21st-century French people